Sidney Weintraub (18 May 1922, New York City – 10 April 2014, Cuernavaca, Mexico) was an economist, foreign service officer, professor, non-fiction author, and novelist.

After leaving U.S. government service, he was the Dean Rusk Professor at the University of Texas at Austin, Lyndon B. Johnson School of Public Affairs from 1976-1994; emeritus thereafter) and holder of the William E. Simon Chair in Political Economy at the Center for Strategic and International Studies in Washington, D.C. from 1994-2011.

Early life

Sidney Weintraub was born 18 May 1922 in New York City to Reuben and Anna (Litwin) Weintraub.

He studied at City College where he obtained a B.B.A. in 1943. He earned his M.A. in journalism at the University of Missouri in 1948 and his M.A. in economics at Yale University in 1958. He obtained his Ph.D. in economics at American University in 1966.

He did his military service in the U.S. Army during World War II, from 1943 to 1946.

Career 
Beginning in 1949 he worked for the United States Department of State as a foreign service officer in Madagascar, Mexico, Japan, Thailand, and Chile.  In Chile from 1966-1969 (during the Christian Democratic presidency of Eduardo Frei), he was simultaneously Economic Counselor of the US Embassy and head of the AID mission.

In the early 1960s Weintraub wrote two thrillers about news hawk Roscoe Barber. In Mexican Slay Ride - set in Mexico where Weintraub had been a diplomat - Barber seeks a woman's killers, eventually uncovering a drug smuggling ring. Reviewing the book in The Saturday Review, "Sergeant Cuff" called the book "Colorful and noisy." In The Siamese Coup Affair, Barber becomes involved in a political assassination and coup d'état.

At the U.S. State Department, Weintraub became the Deputy Assistant Secretary for International Finance and Development from 1969 to 1974. He was the Assistant Administrator of Interagency Development Coordination from 1974 to 1975, and also the Executive Director of the committee.

From 1976-1994 he was the Dean Rusk Professor at the University of Texas at Austin, Lyndon B. Johnson School of Public Affairs. (emeritus after 1994), and was the founding director of the LBJ School's program in U.S.-Mexican policy studies. From 1994 to 2011, he held the William E. Simon Chair in Political Economy at the Center for Strategic and International Studies in Washington, D.C.

He was a senior fellow at the Brookings Institution from 1978 to 1979 and was an international economic consultant from 1981 to 1982. His work on Mexican political economy and U.S.-Mexican relations was influential and, among other things, helped lay the intellectual foundations for the North American Free Trade Agreement (NAFTA). In 2006 the Mexican government awarded him the Order of the Aztec Eagle, the highest decoration granted by Mexico to foreigners.

After 1994 Weintraub remained a member of the advisory board at the Institute of Latin American Studies and Office of Mexican Studies at the University of Texas at Austin.  He belonged to the Society for International Development, American Economic Association, and American Foreign Service Association.

Personal life 
Weintraub was married to Gladys Katz Weintraub from 11 August 1946 until her death in 2001. They had three children: Jeff (born in New York City), Marcia (born in Tananarive, Madagascar), and Deborah (born in Mexico City). From 2004 until his death he was married to Elizabeth Midgley.  

He belonged to the Cosmos Club. Weintraub died April 10, 2014 in Cuernavaca.

Select publications

Novels

Non-fiction books
 
 
 
 
 
 (Coauthor with Stanley R. Ross) 
 
 
 
  (foreword by Paul A. Volcker)
  (foreword by Julius Katz)
 
 (Project co-director with Douglas Johnston)

Edited 

 (Coeditor with Norman V. Walbek) 
 (Editor with William R. Cline) 
 

(Coeditor with Sergio Diaz-Briquets) 
 (Coeditor with Sergio Diaz-Briquets) 
 (Coeditor with Sergio Diaz-Briquets) 
 (Coeditor with Sergio Diaz-Briquets) 
 (Coeditor with Sergio Diaz-Briquets) 
 (Coeditor with Luis F. Rubio and Alan D. Jones) 
 (Coeditor with Rafael Fernandez de Castro and Monica Verea Campos) 
 (Codirector with Chandler Stolp and Leigh Boske) 
 (Editor) 
 (Coeditor with M. Delal Baer) 
 (Coeditor with Joyce Hoebing and M. Delal Baer) 
 (Coeditor with Frank D. Bean, Rodolfo de la Garza and Bryan Roberts) 
 (Coeditor with Christopher Sands)

References

External links
 University of Texas webpage
 Center for Strategic & International Studies webpage

20th-century American economists
1922 births
2014 deaths
United States Army personnel of World War II
City College of New York alumni
University of Missouri alumni
Yale Graduate School of Arts and Sciences alumni
American expatriates in Madagascar
American expatriates in Mexico
American expatriates in Japan
American expatriates in Thailand
American expatriates in Chile